George Wharton may refer to:

 Sir George Wharton, 1st Baronet (1617–1681), English Royalist soldier, astrologer and poet
George Wharton (died 1609) (1583–1609), MP for Westmorland

See also